Igreja de São Gonçalo is a church in Amarante, northern Portugal. It is classified as a National Monument.

Churches in Porto District
National monuments in Porto District
Buildings and structures in Amarante, Portugal